Lewis Richardson is an English amateur boxer who won a silver medal at the 2022 European Championships. He also competed at the 2019 World Championships.

Personal life
Born in Colchester, Richardson began boxing at a young age as a means to keep fit while playing football. After winning the 2012 National School Boy Championships he decided to focus on boxing. He enrolled at the Sheffield Hallam University in 2020 to study part-time for a master's degree in Sport Business Management.

Boxing career
Richardson won a bronze medal at the 2017 National Championships, losing to eventual winner and 2022 Olympic gold medalist Benjamin Whittaker.

In early 2018 Richardson was selected to box for Team GB. A few months after the selection he suffered three stress fractures in his back, leaving him out of action for most of the year. After recovering from the injury he won gold medals at the 2018 GB Championships and 2019 Olympic Test Event, securing him a reserve spot for the European Olympic Qualification Event. After teammate Sammy Lee was forced to withdraw due to injury, Richardson took his place. He won his first fight in March 2020 against Victor Yoka of France before the tournament was suspended due to the COVID-19 pandemic. When it resumed in 2021 Richardson lost to eventual Olympic silver medalist Oleksandr Khyzhniak.

He competed at the 2021 World Championships in Belgrade, losing in his first fight against Almir Memic of Serbia.

While representing England at the 2022 European Championships, Richardson defeated GB teammate Sam Hickey of Scotland in the semi-finals, before losing to Gabriel Dossen of Ireland in the finals, securing himself a silver medal.

He will be looking to compete at the 2022 Commonwealth Games and 2024 Summer Olympics.

References

Living people
Year of birth missing (living people)
Date of birth missing (living people)
English male boxers
Sportspeople from Colchester
Middleweight boxers
Boxers at the 2022 Commonwealth Games
Commonwealth Games bronze medallists for England
Commonwealth Games medallists in boxing
Medallists at the 2022 Commonwealth Games